Silver subfluoride is the inorganic compound with the formula Ag2F. This is an unusual example of a compound where the oxidation state of silver is fractional. The compound is produced by the reaction of silver and silver(I) fluoride:

Ag  +  AgF   →   Ag2F

It forms small crystals with a bronze reflex and is a good conductor of electricity. On contact with water almost instant hydrolysis occurs with the precipitation of silver (Ag) powder.

Crystal structure 
Ag2F adopts the anti-CdI2 crystal structure, i.e. the same structure as cadmium iodide, CdI2, but with "Ag½+ " centres in the I− positions and F− in the Cd2+ positions. The shortest distance between silver atoms is 299.6 pm  (compared to  289 pm in the  metal).

References

Metal halides
Fluorides
Silver compounds